The Grayling Bicycle Turnpike is a multiple-use, non-motorized paved trailway in Michigan, about  long. It begins at the entrance to Hartwick Pines State Park and runs southerly along M-93, eventually meeting Business Loop Interstate 75 (BL I-75) and ending at East Michigan Avenue.

The turnpike is used for a stretch of the Avita Water Black Bear Bicycle Tour, which coincides with the Weyerhauser Au Sable River Canoe Marathon and shadows the route of the canoes over the roadways, beginning in Grayling and ending in Oscoda.

Hiking trails in Michigan
Transportation in Crawford County, Michigan
Protected areas of Crawford County, Michigan